The Bones of Avalon is a novel in first-person narrative mode by Phil Rickman. It is about John Dee, who investigates undercover on Her Majesty's Service. It was followed by The Heresy of Dr Dee.

Plot

Part 1
John Dee gets visited by Elizabeth I of England in Mortlake. She implies she wants to do some research on "our royal ancestor" King Arthur. Subsequently, her Secretary of State Sir William Cecil assigns him to seize King Arthur's bones. This would finally refute the still popular myth of King Arthur's messianic return. Sir William Cecil wants to have Arthur's bones "formally presented" to the Queen by Dee, who HRH considers "her Merlin".

Part 2
John Dee arrives in Glastonbury, where according to Giraldus Cambrensis some centuries ago a successful excavation of King Arthur's remains has taken place. When Dee's supporter Robert Dudley gets seriously sick, the local healer Eleanor Borrow is supposed to cure him. She goes fetching mineral water from the Chalice Well because she thinks it increases the impact of her herbal medicine. Later, when the mutilated corpse of Dudley's servant is found, Eleanor Borrow is suspected to have murdered him as a satanic ritual.

Part 3
John Dee learns that Queen Elizabeth is haunted by nightmares because it is unclear what happened to Arthur's bones. Still his search remains futile. He meets secretly with Eleanor Borrow. She informs him that her late mother worked with John Leland. Craving for visions he talks her into giving him some of her mother's most dangerous elixir. When he awakes after his trip, she has disappeared.

Part 4
John Dee continues his search and even excavates Eleanor Borrow's mother. In her coffin he finds a map she made together with the famous antiquarian John Leland. This reveals to him what Richard Whiting wouldn't disclose even under the most severe torture. But Eleanor has been arrested and sentenced to death.

Part 5
John detects the lost books of the destroyed Glastonbury Abbey. Hereby he also encounters Michel de Nostredame who discloses to him how the Jesuits attempt to replace the Protestantic Queen Elizabeth by Mary Stuart.

Characters 
 John Dee is so famous counterfeit pamphlets are sold under his name, this making him an early victim of brand piracy
Francis Walsingham is the Queen's spymaster
Blanche Parry is Elizabeth I of England's lady-in-waiting and also John Dee's cousin
Sir William Cecil has already served Lady Jane Grey and Mary I of England
Edmund Bonner is an English bishop who warns that French Catholics take the current English Queen for a witch.
Peter Carew is an adventurer who leads John Dee to Glastonbury 
Robert Dudley, 1st Earl of Leicester pretends to be a member of the Queen's Commission on Antiquities
Sir Edmund Fyche is a local authority who once hanged Eleanor's mother for alleged necromancy and accuses Eleanor too
Joan Tyrre is a woman who cherishes folklore and believes in it

Historical inaccuracies 
Phil Rickman admits in the book's Notes and Credits that according to contemporary records Joan Tyrre lived in Taunton.

Reception
The novel received mixed reviews. Jennifer Monahan Winberry considered Rickman's tale enjoyable for connoisseurs of the Arthurian legend but also for aficionados of the Elizabethan era. Margaret Donsbach wrote the plot progressed "slow-moving at times" but a readership "interested in the Renaissance approach to science and the occult" would appreciate the novel as "an authentic, insightful portrayal of the period". Amanda Gillies praised Rickman for his diligent research and recommended his novel strongly for readers who relish historical crime stories. Kirkus Reviews published a similar opinion and judged Rickman had described historical persons "with admirable scholarship and verve". Publishers Weekly reviewer on the other hand complained Rickman's novel wouldn't "do justice to the intriguing Dee" and pointed out that Dee also was a mathematician.

References

2010 British novels
Novels set in the Middle Ages
Fiction about alchemy
Modern Arthurian fiction
Novels set in Tudor England
Fiction set in the 16th century
Atlantic Books books